Erebos is the seventh studio album by Polish band Hate. It was released on November 15, 2010, through Listenable Records. The album was recorded between July and August 2010 at Hertz Studio in Białystok, Poland, and was produced by Adam "ATF Sinner" Buszko and Krzysztof "Kris" Wawrzak.

A video was shot for the title song, which was directed by Sławomir Makowski.

Track listing

Personnel
Hate
 Adam "ATF Sinner" Buszko – guitars, vocals 
 Konrad "Destroyer" Ramotowski – guitars
 Stanisław "Hexen" Malanowicz – drums
 Sławomir "Mortifer" Arkhangelsky – bass guitar

Additional musicians
 Piotr "Lestath" Leszczyński – synthesizer
 Michał Staczkun – samples
 Krzysztof "Kris" Wawrzak – samples

Production
 Adam "ATF Sinner" Buszko – producer
 Krzysztof "Kris" Wawrzak – sound engineering, producer
 Wojciech i Sławomir Wiesławscy – sound engineering, mixing, mastering
 Hi-Ress Studio – cover art and layout, photography

References

2010 albums
Listenable Records albums